Lance Kahler (born 27 June 1977) is an Australian cricketer. He played in two first-class matches and one List A match for Queensland in 1997/98.

See also
 List of Queensland first-class cricketers

References

External links
 

1977 births
Living people
Australian cricketers
Queensland cricketers
Cricketers from Queensland